Abu'l-Barakāt Hibat Allah ibn Malkā al-Baghdādī (c. 1080 – 1164 or 1165 CE) was an Islamic philosopher, physician and physicist of Jewish descent from Baghdad, Iraq. Abu'l-Barakāt, an older contemporary of Maimonides, was originally known by his Hebrew birth name  Baruch ben Malka and was given the name of Nathanel by his pupil Isaac ben Ezra before his conversion from Judaism to Islam later in his life.

His writings include the anti-Aristotelian philosophical work Kitāb al-Muʿtabar ("The Book of What Has Been Established by Personal Reflection"); a philosophical commentary on the Kohelet; and the treatise "On the Reason Why the Stars Are Visible at Night and Hidden in Daytime". Abu'l-Barakāt was an Aristotelian philosopher who in many respects followed Ibn Sina, but also developed his own ideas. He proposed an explanation of the acceleration of falling bodies by the accumulation of successive increments of power with successive increments of velocity.

His thought influenced the Illuminationist school of classical Islamic philosophy, the medieval Jewish philosopher Ibn Kammuna, and the medieval Christian philosophers Jean Buridan and Albert of Saxony.

Life
Abu'l-Barakāt, famed as Awḥad al-Zamān (Unique One of his Time), was born in Balad, a town on the Tigris above Mosul in modern-day Iraq. As a renowned physician, he served at the courts of the caliphs of Baghdad and the Seljuk sultans.

He converted to Islam later in his life. Abu'l Barakat does not refer to his conversion in his writings, and the historical sources give contradictory episodes of his conversion. According to the various reports, he converted either out of "wounded pride", fear of the personal consequences of the death of Sultan Mahmud's wife while under his care as a physician or fear of execution when he was taken prisoner in a battle between the armies of the caliph and that of the sultan. Ayala Eliyahu argues that the conversion was "probably motivated by convenience reasons".

Isaac, the son of the Abraham Ibn Ezra and the son-in-law of Judah Halevi, was one of his pupils, to whom Abu'l-Barakāt, Jewish at the time, dictated a long philosophical commentary on Ecclesiastes, written in Arabic using the Hebrew alphabet. Isaac wrote a poem in his honour as introduction to this work.

Philosophy

Experimental method
Al-Baghdadi described an early scientific method emphasizing repeated experimentation, influenced by Ibn Sina, as follows:

Motion
Al-Baghdadi was a follower of the scientific and philosophical teachings of Ibn Sina. According to Alistair Cameron Crombie, al-Baghdadi

proposed an explanation of the acceleration of falling bodies by the accumulation of successive increments of power with successive increments of velocity.

According to Shlomo Pines, al-Baghdadi's theory of motion was thus

the oldest negation of Aristotle's fundamental dynamic law [namely, that a constant force produces a uniform motion], [and is thus an] anticipation in a vague fashion of the fundamental law of classical mechanics [namely, that a force applied continuously produces acceleration].

Al-Baghdadi's theory of motion distinguished between velocity and acceleration and showed that force is proportional to acceleration rather than velocity. The 14th-century philosophers Jean Buridan and Albert of Saxony later refer to Abu'l-Barakat in explaining that the acceleration of a falling body is a result of its increasing impetus. Abu'l-Barakat also developed Philoponus' theory of impetus, stating that the mover imparts a violent inclination (mayl qasri) on the moved and that this diminishes as the moving object distances itself from the mover.

Al-Baghdadi also suggested that motion is relative, writing that "there is motion only if the relative positions of the bodies in question change." He also stated that "each type of body has a characteristic velocity that reaches its maximum when its motion encounters no resistance."

Space and time
Al-Baghdadi criticized Aristotle's concept of time as "the measure of motion" and instead redefines the concept with his own definition of time as "the measure of being", thus distinguishing between space and time, and reclassifying time as a metaphysical concept rather than a physical one. The scholar Y. Tzvi Langermann writes:

In his view, there is just one time which is similar for all beings, including God. Abu'l-Barakāt also regarded space as three-dimensional and infinite.

Psychology
He upheld the unity of the soul, denying that there is a distinction between it and the intellect. For him, the soul's awareness of itself is the definitive proof that the soul is independent of the body and will not perish with it. On his contributions to Islamic psychology, Langermann writes:

Works
He wrote a critique of Aristotelian philosophy and Aristotelian physics entitled Kitab al-Mu'tabar (the title may be translated as "The Book of What Has Been Established by Personal Reflection"). According to Abu'l-Barakāt, Kitāb al-Muʿtabar consists in the main of critical remarks jotted down by him over the years while reading philosophical text, and published at the insistence of his friends, in the form of a philosophical work. The work "presented a serious philosophical alternative to, and criticism of, Ibn Sina".  He also developed concepts which resemble several modern theories in physics.

Abu'l-Barakāt also wrote a short treatise on the intellect, Kitāb Ṣaḥiḥ adillat al-naql fī māhiyyat al-ʻaql (صحيح أدلة النقل في ماهية العقل), which has been edited by Ahmad El-Tayeb.

All that we possess in the way of medical writing by Abu'l-Barakāt are a few prescriptions for remedies. These remain in manuscript and are as yet unstudied.

Legacy
Abu'l-Barakāt's thought had a deep influence on Islamic philosophy but none on Jewish thought. His works were not translated into Hebrew, and he is seldom cited in Jewish philosophy, probably because of his conversion to Islam.

The famous theologian and philosopher Fakhr al-Din al-Razi was one of Abu'l-Barakāt's eminent disciples. The influence of Al-Baghdadi's views appears especially in Al-Razi's chief work Al-Mabāḥith al-Mashriqiyyah (Oriental Discourses). Abu'l-Barakāt influenced certain conceptions of Suhrawardi.

See also
 Physics in medieval Islam
 Ibn Bajjah
 Fakhr al-Din al-Razi
 Shahab al-Din Suhrawardi

References

Sources 

 Marcotte, Roxanne D. (2004) La conversion tardive d'un philosophe: Abu al-Barakat al-Baghdidi (mort vers 545/1150) sur "L'Intellect et sa quiddite" (al-'Aql wa mahiyyatu-hu). Documenti e studi sulla tradizione filosofica medievale, 15 1: 201–226.

Further reading

External links
 ABU’L-BARAKĀT BAḠDĀDĪ entry in Encyclopædia Iranica.
 Abu ‘l-Barakat al-Baghdadi: Outline of a Non-Aristotelian Natural Philosophy.
 "Abu’l-Barakāt Al-Baghdādī, Hibat Allah." Complete Dictionary of Scientific Biography. 2008. Retrieved October 7, 2011 from Encyclopedia.com
 Ibn Sina and Abu al-Barakat al-Baghdadi on the origination of the soul and the invalidation of its transmigration.

1080s births
1160s deaths
Islamic philosophers
Jewish philosophers
Natural philosophers
Aristotelian philosophers
12th-century philosophers
Physicians from the Abbasid Caliphate
Medieval Jewish physicians
Jews from the Abbasid Caliphate
12th-century physicians
Court physicians
Converts to Islam from Judaism
People from Baghdad
12th-century people from the Abbasid Caliphate
Scholars from the Seljuk Empire